Priyam Chatterjee (born 5 April 1988) is an Indian chef. He is the first Indian chef to be awarded France's Ordre du Merite Agricole. He is based in New Delhi.

References 

1988 births
Living people
Indian chefs